Oerstedina is a genus of epiphytic flowering plants in the family Gesneriaceae, native to Mexico, Costa Rica and Panama. The relationship of Oerstedina to the genus Rufodorsia is uncertain, .

Description
Species of Oerstedina are epiphytic perennial plants, with upright or hanging stems. The flowers comprising the inflorescence are tightly arranged in the leaf axils. The fused petals (corolla) are white to pinkish in colour and form a short, rather inflated tube. The fruit is a pointed berry. The genus is distinguished from Rufodorsia by the inflated shape of the corolla and lack of a reddish colour on its back, and by the pointed shape of the berry.

Taxonomy
The genus was erected by Hans Joachim Wiehler in 1977, initially with two new species. The genus name honours Anders Sandøe Ørsted, a Danish botanist who explored and collected in the neotropics between 1845 and 1848. Wiehler noted that Oerstedina was close to the genus Rufodorsia. Molecular phylogenetic studies have shown a sister relationship between the two genera, and in 2010, Ricardo Kriebel transferred the type species Oerstedina cerricola to Rufodorsia. However, the other two species of Oerstedina have not been formally transferred , so the two genera are not fully synonymized.

Species
Three species were recognized in a 2020 list of New World members of the family Gesneriaceae:
Oerstedina cerricola Wiehler, syn. Rufodorsia cerricola (Wiehler) Kriebel
Oerstedina mexicana Wiehler
Oerstedina suffrutescens L.E.Skog

Distribution
Oerstedina is native to southwest Mexico (O. mexicana), Costa Rica and Panama.

References

Gesnerioideae
Gesneriaceae genera